The Erwood television relay station is sited on high ground to the west of the village of Erwood in Powys, south Wales. It was originally built in the 1980s as a fill-in relay for UHF analogue colour television covering the communities of Erwood, Llandeilo Graban and Llansteffan. It consists of a 20 m self-supporting lattice steel mast standing on a hillside which is itself about 215 m above sea level. The transmissions are beamed northeast and southeast to cover its targets. The Erwood transmission station is owned and operated by Arqiva.

Erwood transmitter re-radiates the signal received off-air from Llandrindod Wells which is itself an off-air relay of Carmel about 40 km to the west. When it came, the digital switchover process for Erwood duplicated the timing at Carmel with the first stage taking place on 26 August 2009 and with the second stage being completed on 23 September 2009. After the switchover process, analogue channels had ceased broadcasting permanently and the Freeview digital TV services were radiated at an ERP of 2 W each.

Channels listed by frequency

Analogue television

1980's - 26 August 2009
Being in Wales, Erwood transmitted the S4C variant of Channel 4.

Analogue and digital television

26 August 2009 - 23 September 2009
The UK's digital switchover commenced at Carmel (and therefore at Erwood and all its other relays) on 26 August 2009. Analogue BBC Two Wales on channel 63 was first to close, and ITV Wales was moved from channel 60 to channel 63 for its last month of service. Channel 60 was replaced by the new digital BBC A mux which started up in 64-QAM and at full power (i.e. 2 W).

Digital television

23 September 2009 - present
The remaining analogue TV services were closed down and the digital multiplexes took over on the original analogue channels' frequencies.

References

External links
The Transmission Gallery: Erwood

Transmitter sites in Wales
Carmel UHF 625-line Transmitter Group